Dr. Dion George is a South African politician, the Shadow Minister of Finance, and a Member of Parliament for the opposition Democratic Alliance (DA). He serves as a member–elected Trustee and Chair of the Investment Sub–Committee of the Political Office Bearers Pension Fund and in the DA's national leadership as Federal Finance Chair. He is a member of the Party’s Federal Council, Federal Executive and National Management Committee.

Elected to the Johannesburg City Council in March 2006, he subsequently took his seat in the National Assembly in January 2008. He was re-elected in 2009 and 2014. He resigned from parliament in May 2015 and returned in November 2018, where he served as a permanent delegate from the Western Cape in the National Council of Provinces. He was re-elected to the National Assembly in May 2019.

Early life
Dion was born in Durban and moved to Vanderbijlpark at a young age, where he completed high school.  At 17, he went to Wits University. After completing his undergraduate degree, he entered the financial services industry where he built his career. During this time, he was a vigorous community activist and this prompted what he describes as his other career, politics.

Education
Dion holds BA (Hons), MBA (Wits) and DBL degrees, an Advanced Certificate in Municipal Governance and a Certificate in Leadership Coaching. His MBA research report entitled "Investment choice for individual members of retirement funds" received the Investec Securities Prize for the Best Research in the field of Investments.

Political career
He joined the Democratic Party in 1995 and, in 2005, was elected chairman of the DA branch in Sandown, Sandton. After the 2006 municipal elections, he served the City of Johannesburg as a PR councillor on various committees, including housing, finance and economic development and municipal accounts.

In January 2008, he took his seat in parliament where he served on the Portfolio Committee on Finance and as political head of the Sandton North and Midrand Constituency.

On his re-election to Parliament in 2009 he was appointed as the Shadow Minister of Finance. He was later appointed to the Standing Committee On Public Accounts (SCOPA). In 2014 he was re-appointed Shadow Minister of Finance. In May 2015 he resigned his seat in the National Assembly. In November 2018 he returned to Parliament and served in the Select Committee on Finance in the National Council of Provinces as a permanent delegate from the Western Cape. He was appointed political head of the Beaufort West Constituency. On his re-election to the National Assembly in May 2019 he was appointed Shadow Deputy Minister of Finance and elected Trustee of the Political Officer Bearers Pension Fund. He is the political head of the Knysna Constituency.

He holds a senior leadership role in the party as Chair of the Federal Finance Committee. He was previously Regional Finance Chair in Gauteng South and Provincial Finance Chair in Gauteng. First elected in 2010, he served until the Federal Congress in May 2015 where he did not seek re-election. He was re-elected in April 2018 and again in October 2020. He also serves on the party’s National Management Committee; Federal Executive and Federal Council.

His objective is to build a non-racial South Africa where everyone can become everything they are capable of becoming.

He continues to help the DA affirm its stance as the “Official Opposition Party” in South Africa and is regarded as one of the great financial minds in South Africa.

References

Offices held

Living people
Democratic Alliance (South Africa) politicians
Members of the National Assembly of South Africa
Year of birth missing (living people)
People from Durban
People from KwaZulu-Natal
People from Gauteng
People from Vanderbijlpark
University of the Witwatersrand alumni
Members of the National Council of Provinces